Harbutt is a surname. Notable people with the surname include:

Charles Harbutt (1935–2015), American photographer
Sandy Harbutt (1941–2020), Australian actor, writer, and director
William Harbutt Dawson (1860–1948), British journalist
William Harbutt (1844–1921), British artist